The 1988 Segunda División de Chile was the 37th season of the Segunda División de Chile.

Rangers was the tournament's champion.

Aggregate table

South Zone

North Zone – Promotion Playoffs

North Zone – Relegation Playoffs

South Zone – Promotion Playoffs

South Zone – Relegation playoffs

See also
Chilean football league system

References

External links
 RSSSF - List of Second Division Champions

Segunda División de Chile (1952–1995) seasons
Primera B
1988 in South American football leagues